Champ is a nickname of:

Athletes

American football
 Champ Bailey (born 1978), American former National Football League player
 Champ Boettcher, American National Football League player in the 1926 season
 Champ Henson (born 1953), American former football player

Baseball
 Champ Cooper, Negro league first baseman in the 1910s
 Champ Osteen (1877–1962), American Major League Baseball player
 Champ Summers (1946–2012), American Major League Baseball player

Entertainers
 Champ Hood (1952–2001), American singer and multi-instrumentalist
 Champ Lui Pio, Filipino guitarist and singer Arthur Lui Pio (born 1982)

Politicians
 Champ Clark (1850–1921), American politician and attorney, Speaker of the United States House of Representatives
 Champ Edmunds (born 1963), American politician

In other fields
 Champ Ferguson (1821–1865), Confederate guerrilla during the American Civil War

Lists of people by nickname